Gill's Regiment of Militia also known as the 3rd Suffolk County Militia Regiment was called up at Stoughton, Massachusetts on August 12, 1777, as reinforcements for the Continental Army during the Saratoga campaign. The regiment marched quickly to join the gathering forces of General Horatio Gates as he faced British General John Burgoyne in northern New York. The regiment served in Gen. Warner's brigade. With the surrender of Burgoyne's Army on October 17, the regiment was disbanded on December 12, 1777.

References 

Massachusetts American Revolutionary War militia regiments